State elections were held in the Free State of Prussia on 20 February 1921 to elect 406 of the 428 members of the Landtag of Prussia. The governing coalition of the Social Democratic Party, Centre Party, and German Democratic Party suffered major losses, losing one-third of its collective voteshare from 1919, but retained a narrow majority. The right-liberal German People's Party (DVP) and reactionary nationalist German National People's Party (DNVP) made the largest gains, with the DNVP becoming the second largest party by voteshare. The Communist Party of Germany contested its first Prussian election, winning 31 seats.

No election was held on the constituency of Oppeln due to the Upper Silesia plebiscite, which was held one month after the state elections. The delegation of 22 deputies which had been elected in Oppeln in 1919 continued in office until a 1922 by-election. The discrepancy between these results meant that the Centre Party held more seats in the Landtag than the DNVP after the 1921 election, despite winning fewer votes.

Results

No election took place in constituency #9 (Oppeln); for this purpose, members of this constituency elected in the 1919 election retained their seats.

Results by constituency

1922 Oppeln by-election

See also
 Elections in the Free State of Prussia
 Weimar Republic

Notes

References

External links

1921 elections in Germany
1921
February 1921 events in Europe